William Ansah Sessarakoo ( 1736 – 1770), a prominent 18th-century Fante royal and diplomat, best known for his wrongful enslavement in the West Indies and diplomatic mission to England. He was both prominent among the Fante people and influential among Europeans concerned with the transatlantic slave trade.

After his father, John Corrente sent Ansah's brother to France, he sent Ansah to England to gain an education, curry favour with the British, and serve as his eyes and ears in Europe. The ship captain entrusted with Ansah's transport, however, instead sold him into slavery in Barbados before reaching England.

Years later, a free Fante trader discovered Ansah in Barbados and quickly alerted John Corrente of his son's fate. Corrente petitioned the British to free Ansah, and the British Royal African Company emancipated Ansah and transported him to England. In England on 1748, Ansah was received as a prince and gained the respect of London's high society. Most notably, he watched a live performance of Oroonoko, and, much to the audience's surprise, fled the theatre in tears. The play depicted a wrongly enslaved African prince who likely reminded Ansah much of himself.

Upon returning to Anomabo, Ansah took up work as a writer at Cape Coast Castle, the primary British fortification on the Gold Coast. After leaving Cape Coast on bad terms, Ansah worked as a slave trader. The details of his death are unknown.

Early life

Ansah was born in Annamaboe, modern-day Anomabu, Ghana c. 1736. Annamaboe was the then largest slave-trading port on the Gold Coast (modern-day Ghana). His father, John Corrente, was the head of Anomabo's government, and chief caboceer (one of the local officials responsible for supplying African slaves to European traders), and an important ally for anyone living or trading in the city. Accordingly, Ansah and his family were of interest to the many European polities competing for access to abundant trade from Annamaboe. Since his father was the head of the local government and an influential man.

Annamaboe represented a major interest for European traders including the Dutch, Portuguese, Swedish, Danish, English, and French on the West African coast. In fact, Annamaboe was the largest slave trading port on the Gold Coast of Africa. By Ansah's birth, however, the primary competitors for trade with the people of Annamaboe were the French and English. While other commodities were traded in Annmaboe, the primary trade was in slaves. Still, the Fante people of Annamaboe rarely sold each other into slavery; the vast majority of slaves sold in Annamaboe were acquired by the Fante people from the African interior.

It was governed by a small group of wise men known as caboceers, one of whom was deemed Braffo or chief caboceer, the role John Corrente filled. While the Europeans in Annamaboe were largely respected, the power undeniably rested in the hands of the African caboceers. Still, the English exercised some control over the locals through their Fort William, and the French through their naval warships.

John Corrente sent one of Ansah's brothers to France in the early 1740s, and that brother returned to Annamaboe with a European education and extensive knowledge of France. Corrente's strengthening relationship with France, however, worried the English traders in Annamaboe. In turn, the England's Royal African Company offered to host another of Corrente's sons. Corrente, eager to play England and France off of each other for Annamaboe's benefit, quickly agreed to send Ansah.

As a child, Ansah had spent extensive time in Fort William and, in the process, gained fluency in English and an appreciation for the nation's culture and traditions. Accordingly, Corrente chose to send him to England as soon as possible with Captain David Bruce Crichton aboard the Lady Carolina.

Enslavement
Captain David Bruce Crichton, however, betrayed Ansah's trust and sold him into slavery in Bridgetown, Barbados. John Corrente and the Fante people fell out of contact with Ansah and presumed him dead. In William Dodd's popular "The African Prince, Now in England, to Zara at his Father's Court," Ansah claimed "The shouted prince is now a slave unknown."  Ansah claimed that "in groans, not sleep, [he] pass'd the weary night, and rose to labour with morning light."

Still, as John Corrente's son, Ansah was well known by the Fante people, and he was discovered by a Fante trader doing business in Barbados. Once the trader relayed news of Ansah's enslavement to Corrente, Corrente insisted that the British free Ansah and carry him the rest of the way to England.

English trade had, during Ansah's enslavement, been suffering in Annamaboe as Corrente blamed the nation for his son's presumed death. Not surprisingly then, the English were quick to jump on the opportunity to return to Corrente's good graces. They liberated Ansah from slavery and transported him to England where he was received as a "The Prince of Annamaboe"

Time in England
Ansah was received in England in 1748 as Prince William Ansah Sessarakoo or The Royal African. Under the protection of George Montagu-Dunk, 2nd Earl of Halifax, President of the Board of Trade, Ansah "received privileged treatment in Britain... for political and economic reasons." In fact, there exist many reports of his "frequent appearances in London society." Most notably, he attended a showing of Oroonoko, a play depicting the wrongful enslavement of an African prince and his wife by Europeans. The African prince, Oronooko, and his wife, Imoinda, are sold into slavery and transported to the West Indies where they are forced to work long hours alongside lowly slaves. When Imoinda becomes pregnant, Oroonoko stages a slave rebellion. The rebellion ends poorly, however, and Oroonoko is forced to kill Imoinda and is himself publicly executed. Given his kidnapping, Ansah likely related to Oroonoko on a very basic level. In William Dodd's "The African Prince, Now in England, to Zara at his Father's Court," Ansah claims: "I can't recall the scene, 'tis pain too great" when referring to Oroonoko.

Regardless, Ansah succeeded in garnering respect for himself and his people as civilized individuals; many were impressed by his manners and graciousness.

Ansah's visit to England was never meant to be permanent, so he returned home to his father and the Fante people in 1750. He returned "elaborately dressed in the latest style befitting his station" with an English education and immense understanding of English culture. Furthermore, in "Zara, at the Court of Annamaboe, to the African Prince, When in England," Dodd's accompanying poem, Ansah's lover repeatedly refers to London as "Britain's happy shore" and thereby suggests that the Fante people and especially Ansah viewed England positively, especially after Ansah's sojourn there.

Later life in Annamaboe

When Ansah left England, he also left the fairytale life of a European prince. In Annamaboe, the elite certainly had many privileges, but the extravagance found in Europe was simply not present. After only a year back in Africa, he began work as a writer at Cape Coast Castle, the seat of British power on the Gold Coast some ten miles Southwest of Annamaboe.

Employing both his position at Cape Coast Castle and powerful connections in London, Ansah worked with his father, John Corrente, to play the British and French off each other in Annamaboe. By pledging allegiance to neither of the two powers, Annamaboe forced both Britain and France to offer competitive trade offers and regular tributes to remain in good standing. Additionally, Ansah is known to have personally accepted lavish gifts of whiskey from the British that were meant for the greater Fante people.

In 1761, however, Ansah became infuriated that William Mutter, governor of Cape Coast Castle, had paid him in watered down whiskey. When he confronted Mutter, the argument developed into a physical altercation, and Ansah was banned from Cape Coast Castle. Mutter went on to claim Ansah was "not a person of Consequence in [Annamaboe]." Indeed, while Ansah was John Corrente's son, he was not Corrente's heir.

No longer in good favour with the British, Ansah spent the rest of his life in Annamaboe. Records exist of him acting as a slave trader during this time, but his activities are relatively unknown. He lived his final days and passed away in relative anonymity, at least from the European perspective that is. As such, the date of his death is unknown. It can nonetheless be estimated based upon the date of his dismissal from Cape Coast Castle and later trade records that he died c.1770.

Impacts on European perceptions of Africans
Ansah serves as an important precursor to the mainstream 18th century abolitionist movement in Britain. His time in England as "The Royal African" set precedence that some Africans were above slavery and comparable to British nobility. Furthermore, his visit forced London society to acknowledge the complex government and society in place in Annamaboe and presumably many other African cities.

In Ansah's memoirs, the author wrote “good sense is the companion of all Complexions” and thereby suggested an inherent equality among those of various races. By establishing this, Ansah's presence in England contradicted the principle of race-based slavery. Instead, justifications for slavery then rested on the alleged crimes committed by slaves that had led to their enslavement. Ansah himself, as a man economically and politically invested in the slave trade, did not challenge the morality of the slave trade, but his very existence in London subverted the idea Africans could be enslaved for no reason. In fact, he is said to have had "a proper Oroonoko-like contempt for the rabble of ordinary slaves". Additionally, his lover, in Dodd's poem, refers to the slave populace as "a barb’rous jest". Clearly, he was no ally to those already enslaved.

While Ansah, as a slave trader himself, did not campaign against the slave trade, his presence in England served to break down the idea that Africans were inherently lesser than Europeans. Additionally, while Ansah's contribution to this change in thought was significant, he was just one of "Several African princes... educated in England" who all contributed.

References

Further reading
 Portraits at the National Portrait Gallery
Between Worlds at the National Portrait Gallery
 The Royal African: or, Memoirs of the Young Prince of Annamaboe
 Hakim Adi, West Africans in Britain: 1900–1960
 Wylie Sypher, The African Prince in London, Jour. Hist. Ideas, 2, 2 (1941), 237–47.

Ghanaian expatriates in the United Kingdom
Barbadian slaves
18th-century Ghanaian people
Year of birth unknown
Year of death unknown
Year of birth uncertain
African slave traders
People from Central Region (Ghana)
18th-century African businesspeople
18th-century slaves